Yoel Hoffmann (born 1937) is a contemporary Israeli Jewish author, editor, scholar and translator. He is currently a professor of Japanese poetry, Buddhism, and philosophy at the University of Haifa in Israel and lives in Galilee.

Biography
Born in Braşov, Romania to  Jewish parents of Austro-Hungarian culture, at the age of one Hoffmann and his parents fled a Europe increasingly under Nazi influence for the British Mandate of Palestine. Shortly after the move, Hoffmann's mother died and he was entrusted by his father to an orphanage where he spent his time until his father remarried.

As a young man, Hoffmann left his home in Israel and traveled to Japan, where he spent two years living in a Zen monastery and studying Chinese and Japanese texts with monks. He would later return to Japan to earn his doctorate. Hoffmann did not begin writing fiction until in his forties, and though chronologically  a member of the sixties "Generation of the State," his work is oft-described as being on the forefront of avant-garde Hebrew literature, with an influence of his Japanese studies discernible in his works.

Hoffmann's first book of fiction, Kätzchen - The Book of Joseph, was published in Hebrew in 1988. He has since gone on to write ten more books in Hebrew, seven of which have been translated into English and published by New Directions; these seven are Katschen and The Book of Joseph (1998), Bernhard (1998), The Christ of Fish (1999), The Heart is Katmandu (2001), The Shunra and the Schmetterling (2004), Curriculum Vitae (2009), and Moods (2015). Hoffmann was awarded the first ever Koret Jewish Book Award, as well as the Bialik Prize by the city of Tel Aviv and the Prime Minister's Prize.

The rights to Hoffmann's latest book, Moods, were sold to Galaade publishing company in France and to Keter Books in Israel in 2010.

Selected bibliography

Writings by the author
Katschen and The Book of Joseph, trans. from Hebrew by  Eddie Levenston, David Kriss, and Alan Treister, New Directions (New York, NY) 1998.
Bernhard, trans. from Hebrew by Alan Treister & Eddie Levenston, New Directions (New York, NY), 1998.
The Christ of Fish, trans. from Hebrew by Eddie Levenston, New Directions (New York, NY), 1999.
The Heart is Katmandu, trans. from Hebrew by Peter Cole, New Directions (New York, NY), 2001.
The Shunra and the Schmetterling, trans. from Hebrew by Peter Cole, New Directions (New York, NY), 2004.
Curriculum Vitae, trans. from Hebrew by Peter Cole, New Directions (New York, NY), 2009.
Moods, trans. from Hebrew by Peter Cole, New Directions (New York, NY), 2015.

Editor and translator
Japanese Death Poems: Written by Zen Monks and Haiku Poets on the Verge of Death, Tuttle Publishing, 1986.
The Sound of the One Hand: 281 Zen Koans with Answers, Basic Books, 1975.

Further reading 
 Rachel Albeck-Gidron, Exploring the Third Option: A Critical Study of Yoel Hoffmann's Works Beer Sheva: Dvir Publishing House and Heksherim Institute, Ben Gurion University of the Negev, 2016
 Jewish Studies Quarterly, 1, no. 3 (1993/1994), Nili Gold, "Bernhardt's Journey: The Challenges of Yoel Hoffmann's Writing."
 Article from Haaretz newspaper on Yoel Hoffmann and the novel Curriculum Vitae
Nili Gold, "Betrayal of the Mother Tongue in the Creation of National Identity," in Ideology and Jewish Identity in Israeli and American Literature, ed. Emily Miller Budick (Albany: State University of New York Press, 2001), pp. 235–58.

References 

Jewish scholars
Academic staff of the University of Haifa
Romanian people of Hungarian-Jewish descent
Romanian emigrants to Israel
Hungarian emigrants to Israel
Israeli Jews
Austro-Hungarian Jews
Romanian people of Austrian descent
Jewish Hungarian writers
1937 births
Living people
Israeli Japanologists